The 131st IOC Session  took place between September 13 – September 16, 2017 at the Lima Convention Centre in Lima, Peru. The host cities for the 2024 Summer Olympics and the 2028 Summer Olympics were elected during the 131st IOC Session on September 13, 2017.

Bidders
At the 127th IOC Session in 2014, Lima, Peru, was selected as session host by the IOC general assembly over Helsinki, Finland, by 54 votes to 30.

Host city elections

Two Olympic host city elections took place at the 131st IOC Session. The host cities of the 2024 and 2028 Summer Olympics were elected.

2024 Summer Olympics

The only candidate city for the 2024 Summer Olympics, Paris, France, was elected during the 131st IOC Session. The two French IOC members, Guy Drut and Tony Estanguet were not eligible to vote in this host city election under the rules of the Olympic Charter.

Candidate city
  Paris

2028 Summer Olympics

The only candidate city for the 2028 Summer Olympics, Los Angeles, United States, was elected during the 131st IOC Session. The three American IOC members, Anita DeFrantz, Angela Ruggiero and Larry Probst were not eligible to vote in this host city election under the rules of the Olympic Charter. 

Candidate city
  Los Angeles

134th IOC Session
Milan was elected as the host city of the 134th IOC Session in 2019. The 134th IOC Session would decide the host city for the 2026 Winter Olympics. Milan eventually decided to bid along with Cortina D'Ampezzo for the 2026 Winter Olympics, thereby forfeiting the 134th Session to Lausanne, Switzerland, as under Olympic Charter rules, the IOC Session deciding the host city of an Olympic Games, cannot take place in the same country that is bidding to host the Olympic Games being decided at that session. Milan and Cortina, won the rights to host the 2026 Winter Games at the 134th Session in 2019. 

Candidate city
  Milan

Election of the new IOC members
Eight new IOC members were elected at the session.

The eight new members who were elected are:
  Baklai Temengil
  Kristin Kloster Aasen 
  Khunying Patama Leeswadtrakul 
  Luis Mejía Oviedo 
  Neven Iván Ilic Álvarez
  Khalid Muhammad Al Zubair
  Jean-Christophe Rolland
  Ingmar De Vos

Election of the new IOC Executive Board members
Two IOC members were elected to the IOC Executive Board at the session.

Denis Oswald and Nicole Hoevertsz were elected to the executive board. Anita DeFrantz was elected to a four-year term as a vice-president, succeeding John Coates, who concluded his term as a vice-president.

Ethics Commission
New members were appointed.
  Ban Ki-moon: chairman
  Angela Ruggiero
  Hanqin Xue
  Samuel Schmid
  Robin Mitchell

See also
 125th IOC Session
 128th IOC Session
 130th IOC Session
 132nd IOC Session

References

International Olympic Committee sessions
2017 in Peruvian sport
2017 conferences
2024 Summer Olympics bids
2028 Summer Olympics bids
2010s in Lima
Sport in Lima
September 2017 sports events in South America
Events in Lima